Wild Safari is a 1971 album by the Spanish group Barrabás, released outside Spain in January 1972. The album was released in some countries under the simple title Barrabás, with a different sleeve design. It was also known as Música Caliente after its subtitle on the back sleeve.

The tracks "Woman" and "Wild Safari" were released as singles in various countries, and "Woman" became a club hit in Europe, Canada and the USA.

"Wild Safari" was used as the background music for a major scene in HBO's 2016 'Vinyl' series. (Season 1, Episode 8)

Track listing
"Wild Safari" (Fernando Arbex) – 5:01
"Try and Try" (Arbex) – 6:15
"Only for Men" (Arbex, Enrique Morales) – 3:32
"Never in This World" (Arbex) – 3:27
"Woman" (Arbex) – 5:04
"Cheer Up" (E. Morales) – 3:51
"Rock and Roll Everybody" (Arbex, E. Morales, Miguel Morales) – 3:40
"Chicco" (E. Morales) – 3:42

Personnel
Iñaki Egaña – lead vocals, bass guitar
Enrique "Ricky" Morales – lead guitar, backing vocals
Miguel Morales – rhythm guitar, bass guitar, backing vocals
Ernesto "Tito" Duarte – saxophone, flute, percussion
Juan Vidal – keyboards
Fernando Arbex – drums, backing vocals, production

Release information
Spain – RCA Victor SAM1957
USA – RCA APL1-0219 (1972)
France – RCA 443.043 (1972) (Different sleeve)
Disconforme DISC 1991CD (2000 CD)

Chart performance

References

 Entry at Allmusic []
 Album cover / sleeve notes
https://www.youtube.com/watch?v=WCNOTAXpn7E

1971 albums
Barrabás albums